Greatest Hits is the first compilation album by American country music artist John Berry. It was released on March 28, 2000 via Capitol Nashville.

Track listing

Chart performance

References

2000 compilation albums
John Berry (country singer) albums
Albums produced by Jimmy Bowen
Capitol Records compilation albums